Ana Teresa Pereira (born 1958) is a Portuguese novelist. She was born in Funchal. She published her debut novel, Matar a Imagem (Killing the Image), in 1989. She has written more than 20 books.

References

Portuguese women novelists
People from Funchal
1958 births
Living people
20th-century Portuguese novelists
21st-century Portuguese novelists
21st-century Portuguese women writers
20th-century Portuguese women writers